Stockwell is a London Underground station in Stockwell in the London Borough of Lambeth. It is located on the Northern line between Oval and Clapham North stations, and on the Victoria line between Brixton and Vauxhall stations. It is in Travelcard Zone 2.

The station opened on 4 November 1890 as the southern terminus of the City and South London Railway, the first successful deep-level tube in London. The Victoria interchange opened on 23 July 1971 when that line was extended south from Victoria towards Brixton. The station is known for its World War II air-raid shelters, and for being the location of the shooting of Jean Charles de Menezes.

History

Original station
Stockwell station was ceremonially opened on 4 November 1890 by the Prince of Wales (later King Edward VII), as the most southerly station on the City and South London Railway (C&SLR) – London's first successful deep-level tube railway. Passenger services began just over one month later on 18 December.

The station was built with a single island platform with tracks on either side, an arrangement rarely used underground on the network, but which exists today at Clapham North and Clapham Common. Stockwell's original platform was further north than the new ones, and trains pass it today. The other terminus of the C&SLR line was King William Street in the City of London. On 3 June 1900, when an extension to Clapham Common was opened, Stockwell ceased to be a terminus. A flight of stairs at the south end of the platform was also added to take passengers to a subway that passed over the new northbound tunnel and joined the lift shaft at a higher level.

The original building, designed by T. P. Figgis, was similar to – but larger than – the existing surface building at Kennington with a domed roof to the original lift shaft. The two lifts each carried 50 people to and from the platforms until their replacement by escalators in 1924. The station was modernised in advance of the 1926 extension from Clapham Common to Morden (Morden Extension). A new surface building was constructed by Charles Holden on the original site. The original station platforms were closed on 29 November 1923 and platforms sited to the south of the original were opened on 1 December 1924. At the same time the platforms were rebuilt to a larger diameter – and with a single platform in each tunnel – south of the original station tunnel.

New station

The station was expanded to accommodate the Victoria line, whose extension from Victoria to Brixton opened on 23 July 1971. Parallel cross-platform interchanges were provided between the two lines in both directions and the 1920s surface buildings were replaced by a modern structure. A British Transport Police station was later built above the station in 1987, replacing a station at Lambeth North, as part of a BTP initiative to increase police presence across London Underground. The Victoria line platforms have tiling designed by Abram Games showing a swan, a reference to the nearby Swan public house.

The station has ticket halls, 3 escalators, 7 gates, 13 payphones, a Wifi service, 9 vending machines and a photo booth. The ticket hall has electronic departure boards. The ticket office was closed in early 2015 as part of the TfL investment programme.

Nearby infrastructure

Deep-level air-raid shelter

Stockwell is one of eight London Underground stations with an adjacent deep-level air-raid shelter, constructed during World War II. The shelter is below the current station, and comprises two parallel tunnels, each approximately six times the length of the current platform.

The total capacity of the shelter was around 4,000 people. Access was via the station as well as two further entrance shafts containing spiral staircases, one of which is located at the middle of the junction of South Lambeth Road and Clapham Road, and the other on Studley Road. The shelter was completed in September 1942, and was used by the Government until 1944 when it was opened to the public. It was used for one year as a shelter. After the war it was used for a period to billet military personnel. One of the entrances has been brightly decorated and is a recognisable local landmark.

Branch tunnel and depot

Just north of the station there is a branch tunnel which led to a nearby generating station (closed 1915), depot and workshop located at the junction of Stockwell and Clapham Roads. The tunnel was very steep with an incline of 1:3.5, so rolling stock was originally pulled up to the surface using a wire rope and a winch. This system was replaced in 1907 by a hydraulic lift, which could carry one locomotive or one carriage.

During the 1920s, the line was closed for reconstruction and the depot was used as a working site for transporting spoil, equipment and works traffic in and out of the tunnels. The depot and lift were finally taken out of use at the end of 1924. The incline tunnel and the lift shaft were plugged on the surface and several blocks of flats were constructed on the old depot site by the LCC. These flats still stand, as does one retaining wall of the old depot with distinctive curved buttresses.

Incidents

 
On 22 July 2005, Jean Charles de Menezes, a Brazilian electrician living in London, was shot dead by plainclothes police officers at Stockwell station. This incident came a day after the failed 21 July 2005 London bombings occurred on tube trains and a bus in London. It later emerged that it was a case of mistaken identity on the part of the police and that Menezes had nothing to do with the attacks. In the immediate aftermath of the shooting a small shrine to de Menezes was created by mourners outside the station. This evolved into a permanent memorial mosaic which was unveiled on 7 January 2010 at the station. It was made by local artist, Mary Edwards, with the help of Menezes' cousin, Vivian Figueiredo, as well as Chrysoula Vardaxi.

Services and connections
Train frequencies vary throughout the day. However, Northern line trains generally operate every 4–6 minutes between 06:06 and 00:12 in both directions while Victoria line trains generally operate every 3–5 minutes between 06:02 and 00:20 in both directions. There is also 24-hour Night Tube service on both lines on Friday and Saturday evenings.

The station is served by London Bus routes 2, 50, 88, 155, 196, 333, 345 and P5, and also by night routes N2 and N155. Additionally, bus routes 88 and 345 have a 24-hour service.

Notes and references

Notes

References

Bibliography

External links

London Transport Museum Photographic Archive:

Northern line stations
Victoria line stations
London Underground Night Tube stations
Tube stations in the London Borough of Lambeth
Former City and South London Railway stations
Railway stations in Great Britain opened in 1890
Tube station